is a railway station in the town of Matsushima, Miyagi, Japan, operated by East Japan Railway Company (JR East).

Lines
Shinainuma Station is served by the Tōhoku Main Line, and is located 381.6 km from the official starting point of the line at Tokyo Station.

Station layout
The station has one side platform and one island platform connected to the station building by a footbridge. The middle line (Platform 2) is not in use.

Platforms

History
The station opened on December 26, 1932. The station was absorbed into the JR East network upon the privatization of the Japanese National Railways (JNR) on April 1, 1987.

Passenger statistics
In fiscal 2018, the station was used by an average of 296 passengers daily (boarding passengers only). The passenger figures for previous years are as shown below.

Surrounding area

Shinanuma Post Office

See also
 List of railway stations in Japan

References

External links

  

Railway stations in Miyagi Prefecture
Tōhoku Main Line
Railway stations in Japan opened in 1932
Matsushima, Miyagi
Stations of East Japan Railway Company